The 1967–68 Botola is the 12th season of the Moroccan Premier League. FAR Rabat are the holders of the title.

References

Morocco 1967–68

Botola seasons
Morocco
Botola